William Lee (born February 10, 1951) is an American wrestler. He competed in the men's Greco-Roman +100 kg at the 1976 Summer Olympics.

References

1951 births
Living people
American male sport wrestlers
Olympic wrestlers of the United States
Wrestlers at the 1976 Summer Olympics
Pan American Games silver medalists for the United States
Pan American Games medalists in wrestling
Wrestlers at the 1979 Pan American Games
Sportspeople from Muncie, Indiana
Medalists at the 1979 Pan American Games
20th-century American people
21st-century American people